Maria Sergeyevna Marfutina (born 5 June 1997) is an inactive Russian tennis player. 

She has a career-high singles ranking by the WTA of 354, reached on 9 May 2016, and a best doubles ranking of 225, achieved December 2016. She has won seven singles and ten doubles titles on the ITF Circuit.

Marfutina won her biggest title at the 2016 Neva Cup, a $100k tournament, in doubles with Anna Morgina, defeating Raluca Olaru and Alena Tarasova in the final.

ITF finals

Singles (7 titles, 2 runner-ups)

Doubles: 22 (10 titles, 12 runner-ups)

External links
 
 

Russian female tennis players
1997 births
Living people
20th-century Russian women
21st-century Russian women